is a municipal university in Japan. Its campus is located in Daigaku-cho, Shimonoseki City, Yamaguchi Prefecture.

History 
In 1962 the college was developed into Shimonoseki City University (SCU).

SCU had at first only one department: the Department of Economics (the Faculty of Economics). The departments have been added as follows:
1983: Department of International Commerce
1990: Shimonoseki Institute for Research of Industry and Culture
2000: Graduate School (Master's courses)
2011: Department of Public Management

Undergraduate Schools 
Faculty of Economics
Department of Economics
Department of International Commerce
Department of Public Management

Graduate Schools 
Department of Socio-economic Systems (Master's course only)
Department of International Business Communication (Master's course only)

Institutes 
Shimonoseki Institute for Research of Industry and Culture
Institute for Collaborative Community Development 
International Exchange Center
University Library
Whale Library and Museum
Pufferfish Library and Museum

External links 
Official website - Japanese

References 

Educational institutions established in 1956
Public universities in Japan
Shimonoseki
Universities and colleges in Yamaguchi Prefecture
1956 establishments in Japan